Resident Evil 4 is a survival horror game developed by Capcom Production Studio 4 and published by Capcom for the GameCube in 2005. Players control special agent Leon S. Kennedy who is on a mission to rescue the US president's daughter, Ashley Graham, who has been kidnapped by a religious cult in rural Spain. Leon fights hordes of enemies infected by a mind-controlling parasite and reunites with the spy Ada Wong.  In a departure from the fixed camera angles and slower gameplay of previous Resident Evil games, Resident Evil 4 features a dynamic camera system and action-oriented gameplay.

Development on Resident Evil 4 began for the PlayStation 2 in 1999. Four proposed versions were discarded; the first attempt was directed by Hideki Kamiya, but series creator Shinji Mikami felt it strayed too far from the series roots, so it was spun-off as Devil May Cry (2001) at his recommendation. Other versions were scrapped until Mikami took directorial duties for what became the final version. The game was originally announced as part of the Capcom Five, a collaboration between Capcom and Nintendo to create five GameCube exclusives to boost hardware sales and demonstrate third-party support.

Resident Evil 4 garnered acclaim for its story, gameplay, graphics, voice acting, and characters, and is often named one of the best video games, winning multiple Game of the Year awards in 2005. It was ported to numerous formats, and became a cross-platform hit, selling more than  copies. It influenced the evolution of the survival horror and third-person genres, popularizing the "over-the-shoulder" third-person view used in games such as Dead Space and The Last of Us. A remake of Resident Evil 4 is set for release in 2023.

Gameplay
The player controls the protagonist, Leon S. Kennedy, from a third-person perspective. Departing significantly from the series' previous games, the gameplay focuses on action and shootouts with fewer survival horror elements. The camera is placed behind Leon and zooms in for an over-the-shoulder view when aiming a weapon, or a first-person view when aiming with a sniper rifle. There is no crosshair for firearms; instead, every firearm has a laser sight. Unlike previous games where players can only shoot straight, up, or down, players have more options. For example, shots to the feet can cause enemies to stumble, and shots to the arms can make them drop their weapons. Players can also shoot down projectiles like thrown axes or scythes.

Resident Evil 4 adds context-sensitive controls. Based on the situation, players can interact with the environment: kicking down a ladder, jumping out of a window, dodging an attack or executing a "finishing move" on weakened enemies. There are also quick time events, in which the player must press buttons indicated on-screen to execute actions such as dodging a falling boulder or wrestling an enemy to stay alive. These are often incorporated into the game's many boss fights, in which the player must avoid instant-kill attacks.

The main enemies are violent villagers referred to as Los Ganados ("The Cattle" in Spanish). Unlike the franchise's traditional zombies, Los Ganados can dodge, wield weaponry like chainsaws and projectile weapons, and are capable of working collectively and communicating with each other. The villagers' leaders may transform into grotesque monstrous forms to do battle with the player when encountered. Other prominent enemies include the Regenerators or Regeneradores, a type of mutated humanoid creature with potent regenerative abilities; the troll-like El Gigante; and the gigantic sea creature Del Lago.

The inventory system features a grid system, represented by an attaché case, that has each item take up a certain number of spaces. The case can be upgraded several times, allowing for more space. Weapons, ammunition, and healing items are kept in the case, while key items and treasures are kept in a separate menu. Items may be bought from and sold to a merchant that appears in various locations. He sells first aid sprays, weapons, allows for weapons to be upgraded and buys various treasures that Leon finds. The various weapons each have their own advantages and disadvantages.

Capcom added content for the PlayStation 2 version, which was later incorporated into the PC and Wii releases. The largest addition is "Separate Ways", a side story which focuses on Ada Wong's involvement in Resident Evil 4 and her connection to the series' villain Albert Wesker. "Ada's Report", a five-part documentary, analyzes Ada's relationship with Wesker and his role in the plot. Other unlockable content in all versions includes the minigame "The Mercenaries" and short scenario "Assignment Ada" (using Ada to retrieve Las Plagas samples), new costumes for Leon and Ashley, new weapons, and a cutscene browser.

Plot
In 2004, U.S. government agent Leon S. Kennedy (Paul Mercier) is on a mission to rescue Ashley Graham (Carolyn Lawrence), the U.S. President's daughter, who has been abducted by a mysterious cult. He travels to an unnamed rural village in Spain, where he encounters a group of hostile villagers who pledge their lives to Los Iluminados, the cult that kidnapped Ashley. The villagers were once simple farmers until becoming infected by a mind-controlling parasite known as Las Plagas.

While in the village, Leon is captured by its chief, Bitores Mendez, and injected with Las Plagas. He finds himself held captive with Luis Sera (Rino Romano), a former police officer in Madrid, and former Los Iluminados researcher. The two work together to escape, but soon go their separate ways. Leon finds out Ashley is being held in a church and rescues her. They both escape from the church after Osmund Saddler (Michael Gough), leader of Los Iluminados, reveals his plan to use the parasite they injected into Ashley to manipulate her into injecting the president of the United States with a "sample" once she returns home, allowing Saddler to begin his conquest of the world.

After killing Mendez, Leon and Ashley try to take refuge in a castle but are attacked by more Iluminados under the command of Ramon Salazar (Rene Mujica), another of Saddler's henchmen who owns the castle, and the two become separated by Salazar's traps. Meanwhile, Luis searches for pills that will slow Leon and Ashley's infection, as well as a sample of Las Plagas. He brings the two items to Leon but is killed by Saddler, who takes the sample, while the pills to suppress the infection remain in Leon's hands. While in the castle, Leon briefly encounters Ada Wong (Sally Cahill), a woman from his past who supports him during his mission. He battles his way through the castle before killing Salazar.

Afterward, Leon travels to a nearby island research facility, where he continues the search for Ashley. He discovers that one of his former training comrades, Jack Krauser (Jim Ward), who was believed to have been killed in a helicopter crash two years prior, is responsible for her kidnapping. Ada and Krauser are working with Albert Wesker (Richard Waugh), for whom both intend to secure a Plagas sample. Suspicious of the mercenary's intentions, Saddler orders Krauser to kill Leon, believing that no matter which one dies, he will benefit. After Krauser's demise, Leon rescues Ashley, and they remove the Plagas from their bodies using a specialized radiotherapeutic device. Leon confronts Saddler, and with Ada's help, manages to kill him. However, Ada takes the sample from Leon at gunpoint before escaping in a helicopter, leaving Leon and Ashley to escape via her jet-ski as the island explodes.

Development
In 1999, producer Shinji Mikami said a Resident Evil sequel was in development for PlayStation 2. Resident Evil 4 underwent a lengthy development, during which at least four versions of the game were discarded. The first version was directed by Hideki Kamiya. Around the turn of the millennium, Resident Evil 2 writer Noboru Sugimura created a story for the game, based on Kamiya's idea to make a "cool" and "stylish" action game. The story was based on unraveling the mystery surrounding the body of the protagonist, Tony, an invincible man with skills and an intellect exceeding that of normal people, with his superhuman abilities explained with biotechnology. As Kamiya felt the playable character did not look brave and heroic enough in battles from a fixed angle, he decided to drop the prerendered backgrounds from previous installments and use a dynamic camera system. The team spent 11 days in the United Kingdom and Spain, photographing objects such as Gothic statues, bricks, and stone pavements for use in textures.

Though the developers tried to make the "coolness" theme fit into the world of Resident Evil, Mikami felt it strayed too far from the series' survival horror roots and gradually convinced the staff to make an independent game. This became a new Capcom franchise, Devil May Cry, released for the PlayStation 2 in August 2001.

"Fog" version 
Development on Resident Evil 4 restarted at the end of 2001. The first announcement was made in November 2002, as one of five games exclusively developed for the GameCube by Capcom Production Studio 4, the Capcom Five. This revision, commonly dubbed the "fog version", was directed by Hiroshi Shibata and was 40 percent finished at that time. The game saw Leon S. Kennedy struggling to survive after having infiltrated the castle-like Umbrella's main headquarters located in Europe and featured traditional Resident Evil monsters such as zombies. During the course of the new story which was again written by Sugimura's scenario creation company Flagship, Leon became infected with the Progenitor Virus and possessed a hidden power in his left hand. The producer of the final version also pointed out that Ashley did not appear back then, though there was a different girl who was never revealed to the public. The game was to feature some first-person elements.

"Hook Man" version 

At E3 2003, Capcom showcased a version widely known as the "hook man version". It was later titled  on the Biohazard 4 Secret DVD. During Mikami's introduction of the trailer, he assured that development was proceeding smoothly and claimed the game was scarier than ever before. The story was set in a haunted building where Leon contracted a bizarre disease and fought paranormal enemies, such as animated suits of armor, living dolls, and a ghostlike man armed with a large hook. The game had an otherworldly feel to it, containing elements like flashbacks and hallucinations that were marked by a bluish tint and a shaking camera. It also displayed various gameplay mechanics that carried over to the final release, like the over-the-shoulder camera and a laser sight for aiming in battles and quick time events. Other features, such as dialogue choices, were removed later. Five minutes of gameplay footage were released on the Biohazard 4 Secret DVD, a Japanese pre-order bonus given out in January 2005.

"Hallucination" version
The Hallucination version had only a basic story concept, having dropped the previous scenario penned by Noboru Sugimura of Flagship. In 2012, Resident Evil 3: Nemesis scenario writer Yasuhisa Kawamura said he was responsible for this version, as he wanted to make Biohazard 4 scarier "and suggested using a particular scene from the film Lost Souls, where the main character [...] suddenly finds herself in a derelict building with a killer on the loose. An arranged version of this idea eventually turned into Hook Man. The idea went through several iterations as Mr. Sugimura and I carefully refined this world (which, I have to say, was very romantic). Leon infiltrates the castle of Spencer seeking the truth, while inside a laboratory located deep within, a young girl wakes up. Accompanied by a B.O.W. [an abbreviation for "Bio Organic Weapon" in the series' lore] dog, the two start to make their way up the castle. Unfortunately, there were many obstacles that needed to be overcome and the cost of development was deemed too expensive." Kawamura added he was very sorry and "even ashamed" that Mikami had to step in and scrap this version. After this attempt, the last cancelled revision featured classic zombies again. However, it was discontinued after a few months, and before it was ever shown to the public, as the developers felt it was too formulaic.

The story of the Progenitor Virus was eventually covered in Resident Evil 5 and the Spencer Estate became the setting for Resident Evil 5'''s downloadable content (DLC) pack "Lost in Nightmares" (featuring Chris Redfield and Jill Valentine).

Final version
Following that, it was decided to reinvent the series. Mikami took over directorial duties from Shibata and began working on the version that was released. In an interview with Game Informer, Mikami explained his decision to shift to a new gameplay system is due to the feeling that the older system is "more of the same" after playing Resident Evil Zero. He says that he only felt nervous once more when playing with the newer system. Speaking for the team, game producer Hiroyuki Kobayashi mentioned how the staff was "tired of the same thing" and how some got bored and moved on to other projects. In addition to that, the producer also felt that the older format was "stuck in a cookie cutter mold" and described it as "shackles holding us down".

However, some of the staff members disagreed about changing the gameplay system. These members felt depressed and were hard to motivate after the game's focus shifted to be more action-oriented. Although Mikami demanded the camera system be revised, the team had reservations about making big changes to the series he had created. Eventually, he intervened, explained his proposed changes, and wrote a new story that, unlike previous installments, was not centered on the company Umbrella. Mikami wrote the entire story in just three weeks due to time constraints. Inspired by Onimusha 3: Demon Siege, a game Mikami had enjoyed playing but felt could have been better with a different view, he decided to place the camera behind the playable character. To go along with the new gameplay and story, a new type of enemy called "Ganado" was created, as opposed to using the undead creatures from previous Resident Evil games. Furthermore, producers expended additional detail to modify and update characters that had previously appeared in the series. In a documentary explaining the conception of the characters, Kamiya stated he intended to make Leon Kennedy "look tougher, but also cool".

Kobayashi was responsible for the design of some of the final game's enemies, such as the Regenerators. Kobayashi described the creatures' origins within universe lore as byproducts of Los Iluminados' research into bio organic weapons, malformed creations implanted with multiple Plaga parasites during the experimentation process. Regenerators are designed to take distinct heavy breaths before they are seen, which alerts the player to their presence. When encountered, often in small confined spaces, they would walk slowly towards the player character. The Regenerator is capable of continuously regenerating itself and cannot easily be dispatched unless the player is able to find the Plaga parasites within its body, which can only be seen with the infrared scope, and specifically target them first. During an interview with Famitsu, Mikami explained that elements like the Regenerators help maintain the survival horror aspect of Resident Evil 4 as a balance between a "scary kind of gameplay and the challenge of overcoming that fear", with the goal of giving players a sense of achievement when they manage to overcome the monster.

The English voice actors recorded their parts in four sessions, over three to four months. Capcom assigned Shinsaku Ohara as script translator and voice over coordinator. Carolyn Lawrence, who provided the voice for Ashley Graham, described her character as "vulnerable, because Leon has to come to her rescue all the time". She also described Kennedy's character as "more brawn, perhaps, than brain". In addition to the voice acting, the game's designer detailed each cinematic sequence so that each character's facial expressions matched the tone of their voice actor.

Along with Resident Evil: Dead Aim and Resident Evil Outbreak, two side story games that did not fall under the exclusive policy, it was announced on October 31, 2004 that Resident Evil 4 would come to the PlayStation 2 in 2005, citing increased profit, changing market conditions, and increased consumer satisfaction as the key reasons. The PlayStation 2 version included new features, primarily a new sub-game featuring Ada Wong. On February 1, 2006, Ubisoft announced that they would be publishing the game on the PC for Windows. On April 4, 2007, a Wii version was announced and was launched later in the year. The game features all of the extras in the PS2 version, along with other additions, including a trailer for Resident Evil: The Umbrella Chronicles.

Release
The original version for the GameCube featured two different collector's editions. The first was available as a pre-order that included the game, the Prologue art book, and a T-shirt. GameStop offered another limited edition that was packaged in a tin box with the art book, a cel of Leon, and a soundtrack CD. Australia received an exclusive collector's edition that came with the game and a bonus disc with interviews and creator's footage.

PortsResident Evil 4 was ported to the PlayStation 2 after Capcom stated that it did not fall under the exclusivity deal with Nintendo. It was released in North America on October 25, 2005. The largest addition is "Separate Ways", a new scenario for Ada written by Haruo Murata. According to producer Masachika Kawata, the Separate Ways campaign was something thought up by the PS2 porting team and was added after getting approval from Shinji Mikami. The port was later included with Code: Veronica X and Resident Evil Outbreak as part of the compilation Resident Evil: The Essentials. The PlayStation 2 version featured two standard and collector's bundles from pre-orders. The standard package included the game and a T-shirt, while the collector's bundle also included a figurine of Leon, and the soundtrack Biohazard Sound Chronicle Best Track Box. This quickly sold out, and a second pressing was released that included an Ada figurine. Another, called the Resident Evil 4: Premium Edition, was packaged in a SteelBook media case, along with the art book, a documentary DVD, and a cel art of Ada.

A PC port of Resident Evil 4 developed by Sourcenext was released in Hong Kong on February 1, 2007, published by Typhoon Games. It was released in Europe, North America, and Australia in March 2007 and was published by Ubisoft. The port contains the bonus features from the PS2 version, such as "Separate Ways", the P.R.L. 412 laser cannon and a second set of unlockable costumes for Leon and Ashley, as well as an Easy difficulty level. It also supports multiple widescreen resolutions. The shadow and lighting problems were fixed in the only patch, Version 1.10.Resident Evil 4: Wii Edition was released for the Wii on May 31, 2007 in Japan and on June 19, 2007 in the United States. It features updated controls that utilize the pointing and motion-sensing abilities of the Wii Remote and Nunchuk, though both the GameCube controller and the Classic Controller are also supported. The Wii Remote is able to aim and shoot anywhere on the screen with a reticle that replaces the laser sight found in the other versions, and motion-based gestures are used to perform some context-sensitive actions, such as dodging or slashing. The Wii Edition also includes the extra content from the PS2 and PC versions, and a trailer for Resident Evil: The Umbrella Chronicles. The Wii Edition became available for download from the Wii U's Nintendo eShop in Europe on October 29, 2015.Resident Evil 4: Mobile Edition was released in Japan for au's BREW 4.0 on February 1, 2008. It was announced by Capcom at TGS 2007. Differences from the original include changing the flow of the story from being continuous to being divided into sections such as "Village", "Ravene", "Fortress" and "Subterranean Tunnel". There is also a more challenging Mercenary Mode. The game uses the MascotCapsule eruption engine and was adapted to the Zeebo and iOS platforms. On July 13, 2009, without any formal announcement, Resident Evil 4: Mobile Edition was released by Capcom for the iOS platform via the App Store in Japan, but was quickly removed, though some players were able to purchase and download it. The game has since been released in Japan and North America. Later, Capcom made an update that had different difficulty levels and high scores. Capcom released a new separate version called Resident Evil 4 for Beginners, which offers the first two levels (three counting a training level) of both Story Mode and Mercenary Mode. However, the rest of the levels are available for purchase in-game as downloadable content. Due to the release of the iPad, Capcom recreated the iPhone version of Resident Evil 4: Mobile Edition and updated it to HD graphics as Resident Evil 4: iPad Edition.

On March 23, 2011, high-definition remastered versions of both Resident Evil – Code: Veronica and Resident Evil 4 were announced to be in development for the Xbox 360 and PlayStation 3, as part of the Resident Evil: Revival Selection series. The ports feature all the bonus content from the previous releases, including "Separate Ways". On July 23, 2011, Capcom announced at Comic-Con 2011 that Resident Evil 4 would be released on September 20, 2011 for the PlayStation Network and Xbox Live Games on Demand. In Japan, Resident Evil 4 and Resident Evil - Code: Veronica were released on a single disc with the title Biohazard Revival Selection on September 8, 2011. For North America and Europe, both games, including Resident Evil 4 HD, were only released as downloads on Xbox Live Games on Demand and PlayStation Network. On February 27, 2014, Capcom released Resident Evil 4 Ultimate HD Edition for Windows. The port features improved graphics and many other enhancements that were included in Resident Evil 4 HD. Resident Evil 4 was re-released on PlayStation 4 and Xbox One on August 30, 2016.

In April 2013, Resident Evil 4 was released on Android, but outside of Japan, it is exclusive to Samsung through Samsung Galaxy Store.

Capcom announced in October 2018 that Resident Evil 4 would be published for the Nintendo Switch sometime in 2019, along with releases of Resident Evil and Resident Evil Zero. All three games were released on May 21, 2019 worldwide and on May 23, 2019 in Japan.

In October 2021, Capcom released a virtual reality (VR) version of Resident Evil 4 for the Oculus Quest 2. Developed by the American Armature Studio, many elements of gameplay like combat and inventory management were changed to accommodate VR. This version, which runs on Unreal Engine 4, also includes redesigned textures with increased resolution. The VR version was heavily criticized by fans, both in Japan and the West, due to Armature Studio's censorship of content. The developers and executive producer Tom Ivey, who stated that the changes were made to "update the game for a modern audience", removed a number of in-game animations (such as the animation triggered when players attempted to look up Ashley's skirt), dialogue and flirtatious banter between characters. Some of these changes were made at the expense of continuity and context in cutscenes essential to the game's plot. The controversy continued when in April 2022 the VR version's executive producer Tom Ivey stood by the changes: "I definitely agree with the changes we made to the game so, we're definitely on board with that, we think it's the right thing".

MerchandiseBiohazard 4 Original Soundtrack was released in Japan on December 22, 2005. It contains 62 compositions from the game and the 48-page Visual Booklet with liner notes from composers Shusaku Uchiyama and Misao Senbongi. Other merchandise included figures by McFarlane Toys, NECA and Hot Toys. Agatsuma Entertainment has also created various miniature collectibles based on several main characters and enemies from Resident Evil 4. Two special controllers designed to resemble chainsaws were designed by NubyTech for use with the GameCube and PlayStation 2 versions. 

Reception
Reviews

The GameCube and PlayStation 2 versions of Resident Evil 4 have a score of 96/100 on Metacritic, indicating "universal acclaim". In addition to the gameplay, the characters and story received positive commentary, leading to the finished product being deemed by most as one of the best video games ever made. GameSpot's Greg Kasavin praised the voice acting, but claimed that it was betrayed by "some uncharacteristically goofy dialogue". Yahoo! Games' Adam Pavlacka and GameSpot's Kevin VanOrd acclaimed Capcom for adding great amounts of detail to the characters. IGN's Matt Casamassina went into further detail in his review for Resident Evil 4, praising not only the detailed character design but also the fight choreography and three-dimensional modeling within cinematic sequences. Casamassina also complimented the voice actors, especially Paul Mercier (Leon), commenting, "For once, the characters are believable because Capcom has hired competent actors to supply their voices. Leon in particular is very well produced". IGN and Nintendo Power specifically recognized Resident Evil 4s character design and voice acting. The increased variety of weapons has been praised by gaming publications such as GamePro and Game Over Online. G4 TV show X-Play gave it a 5 out of 5, for introducing a new style of gameplay for the series as well as incorporating moments where the player would have to interact with the cut scenes. Not long after, it was awarded as the best game ever reviewed on the show. The makers of Resident Evil 4 worked on various innovations associated with the use and inventory of weapons. Game Over stated that players can use the vast array of weapons to "go for headshots now". Game Informer stated that ammunition is more plentiful in Resident Evil 4 than in other games in the series, making it more action-oriented.

The ratings of the PC port were not as high as for the other versions. It was heavily criticized for no mouse support and frustrating keyboard controls, low-quality FMV cut scenes, choppy graphics rendering (lacks shadows and proper lighting) and requiring a gamepad controller for more precise aiming and gameplay. Despite the problems, the game received generally positive reviews from IGN and GameSpot that praised the gameplay.Onyett, Charles (May 25, 2007). "Resident Evil 4 Review (PC)". IGN. Retrieved on February 5, 2009. Japanese game magazine Famitsu reviewed the Wii version, with two editors giving it a perfect 10 score, and the remaining pair giving it a 9, resulting in a score of 38 out of 40. The reviewers felt that the new controls offer something fresh. Multiple reviewers agreed that even those who own the original will find something fun and enjoyable in this version. British magazine NGamer gave the Wii Edition a score of 96%, slightly lower than the 97% given to the GameCube version. They praised the visuals, controls, and features and commented on the fact that such an "exceptional package" was on sale for a low price; however, when writing about the Wii controls, they said, "if you've played the GC version this won't be as special". Official Nintendo Magazine gave the Wii version 94%, 3% less than the original due to it simply not having the same impact it did back then. In 2009, they went on to place the game 9th on a list of the greatest Nintendo games of all time. IGN praised the Wii version, stating it is the superior edition, but does not push the Wii like it did with GameCube and PS2. GameSpot praised the new controls of the Wii Edition but commented on the lack of exclusive Wii features. Hypers Jonti Davies commended Resident Evil 4: Wii Edition for its "visual improvements" but criticized it for having "no new content". The PS3 version of Resident Evil 4 HD received a score of 9.0 from Destructoid, which called it "a hallmark of excellence". In their October 2013 issue, Edge retroactively awarded it ten out of ten, one of twenty-three games to achieve a perfect score in the magazine's twenty-year history.

AwardsResident Evil 4 was named Game of the Year by Nintendo Power and Game Informer. It tied with Kingdom Hearts II as Famitsus Game of the Year 2005. Nintendo Power acknowledged the voice acting in its 2005 Nintendo Power Awards, while IGN gave the game the "Best Artistic Design" award in its "Best of 2005" segment.

The virtual reality port of Resident Evil 4 was named VR/AR Game of the Year at the 2021 Game Awards. It was also nominated for Immersive Reality Game of the Year and Immersive Reality Technical Achievement at the 25th Annual D.I.C.E. Awards.

Sales
The GameCube version sold over 320,000 copies in North America during the first twenty days. The European release sold its entire 200,000 copies during the first month. By December 2005, 3 million copies of the GameCube and PlayStation 2 versions had been shipped worldwide. According to January 17, 2007 sales figures provided by Capcom, the GameCube version of Resident Evil 4 had sold a total of 1.6 million copies worldwide, while the PS2 version had sold over 2 million copies. , Resident Evil 4 has sold at least  copies across multiple platforms; including  copies on PS4/XONE, 2.3 million on PS2, 2 million on Wii, 1.2 million on X360/PS3, and 1.8 million for Ultimate HD Edition on PC. It is the second best-selling Resident Evil game, and holds the record for "Best-Selling Survival Horror Game" in the 2012 Guinness World Records Gamer's Edition.

LegacyResident Evil 4 is considered one of the best video games of all time. Nintendo Power ranked it as number one in their list of the top 25 best GameCube games of all time in 2005 and also ranked it second on their list of the best games of the 2000s in 2010. In 2008, Resident Evil 4 was also ranked first place in the list of the best video games of all time according to the readers of IGN. In 2009, Game Informer ranked Resident Evil 4 number one on their list of top GameCube games and number three on their list of top PlayStation 2 games. ScrewAttack named Resident Evil 4 the best GameCube game of all time, while GamePro ranked it as the second best game for the PS2. In 2010, the readers of PlayStation Official Magazine voted it the 10th greatest PlayStation game. In 2007, Edge ranked the game at second place in its list of top games of all time, behind only The Legend of Zelda: Ocarina of Time. That same year, G4 named it the 21st top video game of all time, calling it "a modern horror masterpiece." In 2015, it placed 7th on USgamer's The 15 Best Games Since 2000 list. In early 2006, in their 200th issue, Nintendo Power ranked it in second place in their Top 200 Games of all-time list, also behind only The Legend of Zelda: Ocarina of Time.Resident Evil 4 is regarded as one of the most influential games of the 2000s, particularly due to its influence in redefining the third-person shooter genre by introducing offset camera angles that do not obscure action. The new gameplay alterations and immersive style appealed to many not previously familiar with the series. The over-the-shoulder viewpoint introduced in Resident Evil 4 has later become standard in third-person shooters and action games, including titles ranging from Gears of War to Batman: Arkham Asylum. It has also become a standard "precision aim" feature for third-person action games in general, with examples including Dead Space, Grand Theft Auto, Ratchet & Clank Future, Fallout, Uncharted, Mass Effect and The Last of Us. In 2019, Game Informer called Resident Evil 4 "the most important third-person shooter ever" and said it "innovated two genres", inspiring developers of both survival horror and shooter games.Resident Evil 4 redefined the survival horror genre by emphasizing reflexes and precision aiming, thus broadening the gameplay of the series with elements from the wider action game genre. However, this also led some reviewers to suggest that the Resident Evil series had abandoned the survival horror genre, by demolishing the genre conventions that it had established. Other major survival horror series followed suit, by developing their combat systems to feature more action, such as Silent Hill: Homecoming and the 2008 version of Alone in the Dark. These changes represent an overall trend among console games shifting towards visceral action gameplay.

While working on The Last of Us, Naughty Dog took cues from Resident Evil 4, particularly the tension and action. Dead Space designers Ben Wanat and Wright Bagwell stated that their game was originally intended to be System Shock 3 before the release of Resident Evil 4 inspired them to go back to the drawing board. BioShock was also influenced by Resident Evil 4, including its approach to the environments, combat, and tools, its game design and tactical elements, its "gameplay fuelled storytelling" and inventory system, and its opening village level in terms of how it "handled the sandbox nature of the combat" and in terms of "the environment." Bloodborne’s environments, enemy design, and shift to a faster combat system compared to previous soulslike games was influenced by Resident Evil 4. Cory Barlog cited Resident Evil 4 as an influence on the God of War series, including God of War II (2007) and particularly God of War (2018), which was influenced by Resident Evil 4s "combination of poised camera exploration and scavenging". Uncharted director Bruce Straley called the Resident Evil 4 village sequence the best opening fight in a video game.Resident Evil Village is heavily influenced by Resident Evil 4 with its own director stating, "If Resident Evil 7 was like a reboot that inherited the DNA of the original Resident Evil, then you could say that this time we’re doing the same for Resident Evil 4. We’ve designed the game and its structure with Resident Evil 4’s essence in mind".

The combat and sound design of the Regenerator and its spike-laden Iron Maiden variant have often been lauded as a memorable horror element of Resident Evil 4, in spite of the game's more action-oriented gameplay compared to its predecessors. Some critics have included the Regenerator in retrospective "top" lists of the  scariest or most memorable monsters in video games. The Regenerators and the Plaga parasite serve as sources of inspiration for the development of the Necromorph monsters from Dead Space.

VentureBeat credits Resident Evil 4 with popularizing video game remastered editions, inspiring remasters including Grand Theft Auto V, Tomb Raider and Grim Fandango.

Copyright lawsuit
In June 2021, the photographer and author Judy Juracek launched legal proceedings against Capcom for using images from her book Surfaces: Visual Research for Artists, Architects, and Designers without her permission to create textures for multiple games, including Resident Evil 4 and Devil May Cry. The parties reached an undisclosed settlement outside of court in February 2022.

Remake
A remake of Resident Evil 4 was announced on June 2, 2022, during a PlayStation State of Play'' livestream presentation. The release is scheduled for March 24, 2023 on PlayStation 4, PlayStation 5, Windows, and Xbox Series X/S.

Notes

References

External links

 

2005 video games
Android (operating system) games
Bioterrorism in fiction
Capcom games
Censored video games
Fiction about parasites
GameCube games
2000s horror video games
IOS games
Nintendo Switch games
Meta Quest games
PlayStation 2 games
PlayStation 3 games
PlayStation 4 games
PlayStation Network games
Resident Evil games
Single-player video games
Survival video games
Third-person shooters
Unreal Engine games
Video game sequels
Video games about cults
Video games developed in Japan
Video games directed by Shinji Mikami
Video games set in 2004
Video games set in castles
Video games set in Europe
Video games set in Spain
Video games set on fictional islands
Wii games
Wii games re-released on the Nintendo eShop
Windows games
Xbox 360 games
Xbox 360 Live Arcade games
Xbox One games
Zeebo games
Spike Video Game Awards Game of the Year winners
The Game Awards winners
Golden Joystick Award winners
Japan Game Award winners